The Battle of Leskovac took place on September 24, 1454. During the Ottoman invasion, two Serbian armies were set up to defend the Despotate, with the 1st army being commanded by Nikola Skobaljić in Dubočica, near Leskovac, and the 2nd army being on the banks of Sitnica River in Kosovo. 

An initial invading Ottoman force heading from Sofia cut off Skobaljić's army from Serbia's north. Despot Đurađ Branković suggested that Skobaljić either surrender, or hide from the Ottoman army until John Hunyadi was able to reinforce or liberate the trapped half of the Serbian army, which would render the Ottomans to pillage and raze the rich southern part of the despotate with no resistance. The young voivode disobeyed the despot, and the invading Ottoman army coming from Macedonia was met by Nikola Skobaljić near Banja. The Serbs scored a decisive victory against the Ottoman army, employing guerrilla tactics.

Skobaljić continued his forays against the Ottomans, operating in Southern Serbia and the Leskovac area, and scored several victories against the armies of the Sultan, especially in the Battle of Kruševac, with the help of John Hunyadi. The failure of his generals to beat a tiny army rendered Mehmed II to deal with Skobaljić personally. He reinforced his armies and finally confronted Skobaljić on November 16th, finally defeating his army at Tripolje (near Novo Brdo), where Voivode Nikola and his men fought to the last man, inflicting disproportionately large casualties on the Ottoman force.

Notes 

Leskovac
Leskovac
1454 in the Ottoman Empire
Leskovac
1454 in Europe
15th century in Serbia